Oliver Heil (born June 19, 1988) is a German footballer who plays as a striker for SC Hessen Dreieich.

Career

Heil played as a youth for SV Rohrbach and SV Darmstadt 98 before joining FSV Mainz, where he broke into reserve team in 2008. After scoring eight goals in his first season he joined SV Waldhof Mannheim where he spent six months before returning to Darmstadt in January 2010. In his first full season with Darmstadt he finished as the club's top scorer, with twelve goals, as they won the Regionalliga Süd title, and promotion to the 3. Liga. He made his first appearance at this level in August 2011, as a substitute for Kevin Wölk in a 1–0 win over SV Wehen Wiesbaden. He left Darmstadt at the end of the season, signing for SV Babelsberg 03, also of the 3. Liga where he spent a year, leaving in July 2013 after the club were relegated to the Regionalliga Nordost. Shortly afterwards he signed for amateur side Eintracht Wald-Michelbach.

External links

1988 births
Living people
1. FSV Mainz 05 II players
SV Waldhof Mannheim players
SV Darmstadt 98 players
SV Babelsberg 03 players
German footballers
3. Liga players
Association football forwards
SC Hessen Dreieich players
Sportspeople from Darmstadt